The Schladming Tauern are a subrange of the Austrian Central Alps within the Eastern Alps. Together with the Radstadt Tauern, the Rottenmann and Wölz Tauern and the Seckau Tauern the Schladming Tauern form the major range known as the Low Tauern. The mountains are located in Austria in the federal states of Salzburg and Styria. 
Its highest peak, at 2,862 m is the Hochgolling.

Location 
The Schladming Tauern are located in the middle of the Low Tauern between the Sölk Pass in the east and the top of the Tauern Pass in the west. The name comes from the town of Schladming in the Enns valley.

Neighbouring ranges 
The Schladming Tauern border on the following other mountain ranges of the Alps:

 Rottenmann and Wölz Tauern (to the east)
 Nock Mountains (to the south)
 Radstadt Tauern (to the west)
 Salzburg Slate Alps (to the northwest)
 Dachstein Mountains (to the north)

Subdivision 

The Schladming Tauern are divided into six subgroups which are (from west to east), the:

 Seekarspitze Group between the Radstadt Tauern and the Oberhütten Saddle:
 Großes Gurpitscheck
 Gamskarlspitze
 Seekarspitze
 Kalkspitze Group between the Oberhütten Saddle and the Lignitzhöhe :
 Hundstein
 Vetternspitzen
 Styrian and Lungauer Kalkspitze
 Hochgolling Group between Lignitzhöhe and Waldhorntörl:
 Hochgolling
 Kasereck
 Elendberg
 Zwerfenberg 
 Hocheck
 Greifenberg
 Hochwildstellen Group between the Waldhorntörl and the Lanschitzscharte :
 Hochwildstelle
 Waldhorn
 Deichselspitze
 Hohes Schareck
 Preber Group between the Lanschitzscharte and the Hubenbauertörl :
 Roteck
 Preber
 Predigtstuhl
 Knallstein Group between the Hubenbauertörl and the Sölk Pass:
 Großer Knallstein
 Ruprechtseck

References

Literature 
 Peter Holl: Alpenvereinsführer Niedere Tauern, Bergverlag Rudolf Rother, Munich, 1983.

External links 

 
Mountain ranges of the Alps
Mountain ranges of Styria
Mountain ranges of Salzburg (state)